The Kingdom is the fifth studio album by Starfield, released on January 31, 2012.

Reception
The album entered the Canadian Albums Chart at No. 66.

Track listing

References

External links
Starfield's official site

2012 albums
Starfield (band) albums